The Fokker V.39 was a prototype sports aircraft built by Fokker shortly after World War I based on a scaled-down version of the Fokker D.VIII fighter design and powered by an 82 kW (110 hp) Le Rhône engine. 

An even smaller and lighter version was built as the V.40, powered by a 26 kW (35 hp) Anzani. Neither the V.39 nor the V.40 entered production.

Bibliography

1910s German sport aircraft
V.39
Rotary-engined aircraft
Parasol-wing aircraft
Single-engined tractor aircraft